Tabeling is a surname. Notable people with the surname include:
 Iris Tabeling (born 1991), Dutch badminton player
 Patrick Tabeling, French physicist
 Robin Tabeling (born 1994), Dutch badminton player